Lindsay C. Stringer is a Professor in Environment and Development at the University of York.

Stringer's research is interdisciplinary and uses theories and methods from both the natural and social sciences to understand  human-environment relationships, feedbacks and trade-offs, examining the impacts for human wellbeing, equity and the environment

Education 

 PhD Geography, University of Sheffield, Department of Geography, 2005
 MSc Environmental Monitoring and Assessment in Drylands, University of Sheffield Department of Geography, 2001
 BSc Physical Geography, University of Sheffield Department of Geography, 2000

Career 

Stringer has been involved in research on land, food, water, energy and climate change worth c.£42 million (total value) since 2005.

She chaired the Independent International Task Force for the Dryland Systems Programme of the Consultative Group on International Agricultural Research (CGIAR) from 2014-2016.

She was an Intergovernmental Panel on Climate Change (IPCC) lead author for the Special Report on Climate Change and Land Use.

She is currently IPCC lead author for the 6th Assessment Report (AR6) as well as Coordinating Lead Author for the IPCC AR6 cross-chapter paper on Deserts, Desertification and Semi-arid Areas.

She was Coordinating Lead Author for the Intergovernmental science-policy Platform on Biodiversity and Ecosystem Services (IPBES) Africa Regional Assessment , and Lead Author for the IPBES Land Degradation and Restoration Assessment.

Stringer is involved in the Economics of Land Degradation (ELD) Initiative, as well as being an Elected Steering Committee Member for DesertNet International.

She was competitively selected for the international Homeward Bound expedition to Antarctica: a women in climate science leadership programme in 2016.

She was Director of the Sustainability Research Institute (SRI) at the School of Earth and Environment, University of Leeds, UK from 2011-2014

Prizes 

 Royal Society Wolfson Research Merit Award, 2017 
 Women of Achievement Award, 2015 
 Philip Leverhulme Prize for advancing sustainability in the world’s drylands, 2013

References 

Living people
British geographers
Alumni of the University of Sheffield
Academics of the University of Leeds
Environmental social scientists
People from Gravesend, Kent
Year of birth missing (living people)